Annie Basil (née Anna Barseghyan; October 13, 1911, in Shiraz - November 5, 1995, in Calcutta) was an Iranian-born Indian activist and stage actress. Originally a theatre actress, she was a member of the Indian Academy of Fine Arts. She served as chairwoman of the Armenian Women's Benevolent Union from 1965 to 1967, then served as chairwoman of the National Women's Council of India from 1969 to 1973.

References 

1911 births
1995 deaths
Iranian activists
Iranian stage actresses
Indian activists
Indian stage actresses
Iranian emigrants to India